List by Family Name: A - B - C - D - E - F - G - H - I - J - K - M - N - O - R - S - T - U - W - Y - Z
 Hagiwara Sakutaro (November 1, 1886 – May 11, 1942)
 Hanada Kiyoteru (March 29, 1909 – September 23, 1974)
 Haniya Yutaka (December 19, 1909 – February 19, 1997)
 Hanmura Ryō (October 27, 1933 – March 4, 2002)
 Hara Takashi (February 9, 1856 – November 4, 1921)
 Hara Tamiki (November 15, 1905 – March 13, 1951)
 Hase Seishū (born February 18, 1965)
 Hasegawa Kaitarō (17 January 1900 – 29 June 1935)
 Hasegawa Nyozekan (1875–1969)
 Hasegawa Shigure (October 1, 1879 – August 22, 1941)
 Hashida Sugako (born 1925)
 Hashimoto Shinkichi (December 24, 1882 – January 30, 1945)
 Hayama Yoshiki (March 12, 1894 – October 18, 1945)
 Hayami Yuji (born 1961)
 Hayao Miyazaki (born 1941)
 Hayashi Fumiko (1903 or 1904 – June 28, 1951)
 Hayashi Fubo (1900–1935)
 Hayashi Fusao (May 30, 1903 – October 9, 1975)
 Higashino Keigo (born February 4, 1958)
 Higuchi Ichiyō (May 2, 1872 – November 23, 1896)
 Himuro Saeko (January 11, 1957 – June 6, 2008)
 Hinatsu Konosuke (February 22, 1890 – June 13, 1971)
 Hino Ashihei (January 25, 1907 – January 24, 1960)
 Hirabayashi Taiko (1905–1971)
 Hiraide Shu (April 3, 1878 – March 17, 1914)
 Hiraiwa Yumie (born 1932)
 Hirotsu Kazuo (December 5, 1891 – September 21, 1968)
 Hirotsu Ryurō (July 15, 1861 – October 15, 1928)
 Hisao Juran (April 6, 1902 – October 6, 1957)
 Hojo Hideji (1902 – May 19, 1996)
 Hori Akira (born 1944)
 Hori Tatsuo (December 28, 1904 – May 28, 1953)
 Horiguchi Daigaku (January 8, 1892 – March 15, 1981)
 Hosaka Kazushi (born 1956)
 Hoshi Shinichi (September 6, 1926 – December 30, 1997)
 Hoshino Tatsuko (November 15, 1903 – March 3, 1984)
 Hoshino Tenchi (1862–1950)

H